M33-013406.63, also known as B416, is a blue supergiant star in the constellation of Triangulum. It is located within the Triangulum Galaxy, which is approximately 2,380,000–3,070,000 light years away from Earth.

It is potentially one of the most luminous stars ever discovered, estimated to be approximately between 3 and 10 million times more luminous than the Sun, although it is thought likely to be a multiple star system.  Modelling of the spectrum based on some assumptions about the relative sizes of the two stars suggests a secondary around half a million times as luminous as the Sun and the primary over four million times as luminous as the Sun.

Notes

References 

O-type supergiants
Binary stars
Triangulum (constellation)
Triangulum Galaxy